Strangers in Love is a 1932 American pre-Code comedy film directed by Lothar Mendes, written by Grover Jones, William J. Locke and William Slavens McNutt, and starring Fredric March, Kay Francis, Stuart Erwin, Juliette Compton, George Barbier, Sidney Toler and Earle Foxe. It was released on March 4, 1932, by Paramount Pictures.

Cast
Fredric March as Buddy Drake/Arthur Drake
Kay Francis as Diana Merrow
Stuart Erwin as Stan Kenney
Juliette Compton as Muriel Preston
George Barbier as Mr. Merrow
Sidney Toler as McPhail
Earle Foxe as J.C. Clark
Lucien Littlefield as Professor Clark
Leslie Palmer as Bronson
Gertrude Howard as Snowball
Ben Taggart as Crenshaw

References

External links 
 

1932 films
American comedy films
1932 comedy films
Paramount Pictures films
Films directed by Lothar Mendes
American black-and-white films
Films based on British novels
1930s English-language films
1930s American films